The Northeast Georgia Council, a local council of the Boy Scouts of America, provides scouting programs for 26 counties in northeastern Georgia, and serves more than 25,000 youth in Cub Scouting, Boy Scouting, Varsity Scouting, Venturing, Exploring, and in-school Learning for Life.

Organization
The council has service centers is in Pendergrass and Lawrenceville, Georgia. The council is administratively divided into seven districts (not including the E-V district):
 Apalachee District serves northern Gwinnett County;
 Chattahoochee District serves Barrow, Hall, and Jackson counties;
 Cherokee district serves Hart, Elbert, Franklin, Madison, Clarke, Oglethorpe, Oconee, Morgan, and Greene counties;
 Currahee District serves Banks, Habersham, Rabun, Stephens, and White counties;
 Etowah District serves Forsyth, Dawson, and Lumpkin counties;
 Mountain District serves Gilmer, Fannin, Towns, and Union counties;
 Sweetwater District serves Walton and southern Gwinnett counties.
 Exploring-Venturing District offers the Venturing and Exploring programs in Gwinnett and Walton counties (as these are not discussed in their other districts' roundtables.)

Camps

Camp Rainey Mountain
Camp Rainey Mountain, founded in 1954, is a Boy Scout camp near Clayton, Georgia. Centered around Lake Toccoa, the camp contains 25 campsites with tents and/or Adirondacks. Just off of the Parade Field is the H. Randolph Holder Dining Hall, where scouts, scouters, and staff eat most of their meals during the week. The camp as well hosts a trading post, where T-shirts, pocket knives, and other camp goods and merchandise are sold, Attached to the trading post is the snack shack, where campers and staff can pick up candies, sodas, ice cream, and other snacks. Each week, campers and staff attend three campfires. The Stewart Amphitheater, located directly off the shore of Lake Toccoa, hosts two campfires each week and one is held in the campers respective areas of camp. In previous years, all three were held in the amphitheater, however, at the start of the COVID-19 Pandemic, the Wednesday night campfire was moved into a smaller setting. The Amphitheater is made entirely of granite from Elberton, GA. On the North end of camp, the Big Rock trail guides hikers to a granite outcrop on the side of Rainey Mountain itself, providing a scenic view of the camp and the Blue Ridge Mountains around. Summer camp typically runs for seven weeks, starting in early June and running until late July, but the camp is available for Scout Troops to enjoy year round.

The main activities during Summer camp are the merit badge classes. Class periods are 50 minutes long, but many classes run for two or three periods. For the 2022 Summer camp season, 65 different merit badge classes were offered, including some in combined classes which allowed scouts to earn multiple merit badges in one period. For adults, classes such as Safe Swim Defense, Climb on Safely, CPR/AED Certification, and Introduction to Outdoor Leadership Skills are offered. In addition to merit badge classes, Camp Rainey Mountain provides many classes that focus on other areas of scouting. A program called TNT (The New Trail) is offered, which provides newer scouts with an opportunity to focus on rank advancement in a structured, group setting. The Waterfront offers the BSA Lifeguard course, which certifies older scouts and adult leaders to be lifeguards, allowing safer year-round aquatics activities for their troops. High Adventure classes are available as well, including C.O.P.E, the Climbing merit badge, and many off-property opportunities like Whitewater KR. A program called BOW Xtreme Skills teaches scouts about outdoor skills and focuses on survival techniques.

Scoutland
Located on Lake Lanier, Scoutland provides year-round camping and aquatics activities. Scoutland is home to one of Northeast Georgia Council's two Summer camps and to Webelos Adventure Camp.

Camp Rotary
Located on Lake Hartwell, Camp Rotary provides year-round "primitive" camping. This 25-acre camp on the lake was built with funds raised by the Rotary Club of Hartwell, Georgia.

Order of the Arrow 
The Northeast Georgia Council is served by Mowogo Lodge of the Order of the Arrow. Each year, hundreds of hours of service are provided by the arrowmen to the council's three camps. Mowogo Lodge was first chartered in 1950, but the exact date the Order of the Arrow arrived in the Northeast Georgia Council is unknown. The word Mowogo comes from the name of a good friend to the council's camping and scouting program, Moses W. Gordon. The Lodge's totem is a black bear on all fours.

Mowogo Lodge is divided into seven Chapters, each representing a different district:

 Ani-Gatogewi (Cherokee District)
 Canantutlaga (Apalachee District)
 Japeechen (Etowah District)
 Jutaculla (Curahee District)
 Lau-in-nih (Sweetwater District)
 Machque (Mountain District)
 Yona-Hi (Chattahoochee District)

The current Lodge Chief is Joseph McGahee. Rusty Royston serves as the Lodge Adviser and Phil Nichols, Council Program Director, serves as the Lodge Staff Adviser.

Camp Rainey Mountain hosted the Southern Region, Section 9 (stylized as SR-9) Conclave in April 2016. On 28 December 2021, Mowogo Lodge was moved from SR-9 into Eastern Region, Section 6 (stylized as Section E6), as part of the national restructuring the Order of the Arrow underwent through Project Magellan. Mowogo Lodge has maintained an active leadership presence in the Section since 2021. Jacob Ball and James Chalmers served as the 2021-2022 Section Secretary and 2021-2022 Section Vice Chief, respectively. James Chalmers is currently serving as the 2022-2023 Section Chief. Camp Rainey Mountain is set to hold the Section E6 Indian Winter in January 2027 and Conclave in April 2028.

Jason Stribling, a member of Mowogo Lodge, was honored with the Distinguished Service Award at NOAC 2022.

See also
Scouting in Georgia (U.S. state)

External links
Official Website

References

Southern Region (Boy Scouts of America)
Boy Scout Councils in Georgia (U.S. state)